Iron Lord is an adventure video game developed by Orou Mama and Ivan Jacot for the Atari ST and published by Ubi Soft in 1989. It was ported to the Amiga, Acorn Archimedes, Amstrad CPC, Commodore 64, ZX Spectrum, and DOS.

Reception
Computer Gaming World approved of Iron Lords graphics but criticized its performance and load times, especially as it could not run from a hard drive. The magazine nonetheless concluded that the game was "an above-average combination of adventure, strategy and action gaming". The game was reviewed in 1990 in Dragon #159 by Hartley, Patricia, and Kirk Lesser in "The Role of Computers" column. The reviewers gave the game 4 out of 5 stars.

Reviews
Your Sinclair (Oct, 1989)
ST Format (Feb, 1990)
Commodore User (Oct, 1989)
Amiga Joker (Jan, 1990)
Commodore Format (Oct, 1990)
Sinclair User (Oct, 1989)
Amiga Format (Feb, 1990)
Zzap! (Feb, 1990)
Power Play (Feb, 1990)
Tilt (Mar, 1990)
Zzap! (Italy) (Oct, 1989)
Crash! (Oct, 1989)
ACE (Advanced Computer Entertainment) (Feb, 1990)
ASM (Aktueller Software Markt) (Dec, 1989)
Amiga Power (May, 1991)
Enchanted Realms (Jan, 1991)

References

External links
Iron Lord at Atari Mania

1989 video games
Ubisoft games
Video games set in the Middle Ages
Acorn Archimedes games
Amiga games
Amstrad CPC games
Atari ST games
Commodore 64 games
DOS games
Video games scored by Jeroen Tel
Video games developed in France
ZX Spectrum games